Latukefu is a Tongan surname. Notable people with this surname include:

Pouvalu Latukefu (born 1971), Tongan rugby union player
Sione Latukefu, Tongan historian
Hau Latukefu (born 1976) Australian hip hop musician and radio host
Uli Latukefu (born 1983), Australian actor and singer

Tongan-language surnames